Bent Cherk is a village in the commune of Ksabi, in Ouled Khoudir District, Béchar Province, Algeria. The village is located near the border with Adrar Province and is connected to the N6 to the southwest by a local road.

References

Neighbouring towns and cities

Populated places in Béchar Province